is a Japanese manga series written and illustrated by Keigo Shinzō. It has been serialized in Shogakukan's seinen manga magazine Weekly Big Comic Spirits since April 2021.

Publication
Shogakukan has collected its chapters into individual tankōbon volumes. The first volume was released on September 10, 2021. As of September 30, 2022, four volumes have been released.

Volume list

Reception
Hirayasumi ranked 3rd on "The Best Manga 2022 Kono Manga wo Yome!" ranking by Freestyle magazine. It won the Tokyo News Services' TV Bros magazine Bros. Comic Award 2021. The manga was nominated for the 15th Manga Taishō in 2022 and placed third with 66 points. The series ranked 6th on the Publisher Comics' Recommended Comics of 2022. Alongside Nabe ni Dangan wo Ukenagara, Hirayasumi ranked 18th in the 2023 edition of Takarajimasha's Kono Manga ga Sugoi! list of best manga for male readers. It has been nominated for the 27th Tezuka Osamu Cultural Prize in 2023.

The series received positive comments from manga artists, including Inio Asano, Taiyō Matsumoto and Yama Wayama. It was also praised by the comedy duo .

See also
Tokyo Alien Bros., another manga series by the same author
Nora to Zassō, another manga series by the same author

References

External links
  

Iyashikei anime and manga
Seinen manga
Shogakukan manga